is a Japanese sports manga series written by Ikki Kajiwara and illustrated by Noboru Kawasaki. It was serialized in Kodansha's Weekly Shōnen Magazine from 1966 to 1971. It is about the actual baseball team Yomiuri Giants using fictional characters. It was launched by the "Yomiuri Group" which at the time owned not only the actual baseball team, but the TV network Nippon Television, the newspaper Yomiuri Shimbun, as well as Yomiuri Telecasting Corporation. It was adapted into an anime television series broadcast in Japan in 1968. It later spawned two anime sequels and different anime movies.

Story
The story is about Hyūma Hoshi, a promising young baseball pitcher who dreams of becoming a top star like his father Ittetsu Hoshi in the professional Japanese league. Ittetsu was once a 3rd baseman until he was injured in World War II and was forced to retire; now an impoverished and bitter widower, he's raised Hyūma and his older sister Akiko in a very severe environment. The boy would join the ever popular Giants team, and soon he realized the difficulty of managing the high expectations. From the grueling training to battling the rival Mitsuru Hanagata in the Hanshin Tigers, Hyūma would have to take out his best pitching magic to step up to the challenge.

Characters
Hyūma Hoshi: Tōru Furuya
Ittetsu Hoshi: Seizō Katō
Akiko Hoshi: Fuyumi Shiraishi
Ban Chūta: Jōji Yanami
Mitsuru Hanagata: Makio Inoue
Kawakami Tetsuharu: Tadashi Nakamura
Masaichi Kaneda: Teiji Ōmiya
Kyōko: Reiko Mutō
Hosaku Samon: Shingo Kanemoto
Mina Hadaka: Yoshiko Matsuo

Media

Manga

Anime
Beginning in 2001, the series was re-released on DVD format. In June 2013, a five set Blu-ray release was released.

Films
The first Star of the Giants movie debuted on July 26, 1969, as part of the vacation anime festival on large screen theatres in color. The draw was that most people had black and white TVs at the time. The Star of the Giants vs. Mighty Atom TV special reached the United States and was renamed to Astro Boy vs. the Giants.

Video games
Kyojin no Hoshi (The Anime Super Remix) was released for the PlayStation 2 by Capcom on June 20, 2002. There were also a number of other games on the same platform.

Reception and legacy
On TV Asahi's Manga Sōsenkyo 2021 poll, in which 150.000 people voted for their top 100 manga series, Star of the Giants ranked #38.

The anime series ranked #15 on TV Asahi's Top 100 Anime 2005 poll.

Professional baseball player Ichiro Suzuki used Star of Giants as a reference to his grueling childhood baseball training. The anime was remade in India in 2012 as Suraj: The Rising Star where cricket was substituted for baseball. Episode 18 of Kyatto Ninden Teyandee (dubbed and released in North America as Samurai Pizza Cats) includes a pitcher named Puma Pochi, voiced by Tōru Furuya, as a direct parody of Hyūma Hoshi. In English, the character is renamed Fernando Curtainzuela.

References

External links
 Star of Giants Official anime site by Tokyo Movie Shinsha. 
 

1966 manga
1968 anime television series debuts
1977 anime television series debuts
1979 anime television series debuts
Baseball in anime and manga
Ikki Kajiwara
Kodansha manga
Nippon TV original programming
Shōnen manga
TMS Entertainment
Yomiuri Telecasting Corporation original programming
Gekiga